Kosar may refer to:

People with the name
 Bernie Kosar (born 1963), American football quarterback
 Scott Kosar, American screenwriter

Other uses
 Kosar people, tribe mentioned in the ancient Tamil literature
 Kosar Point, headland of Alexander Island, Antarctica

See also
 Kowsar (disambiguation)